The little rockfish, Acanthoclinus rua, is a longfin of the family Plesiopidae, found only in New Zealand's subtidal zone and in rock pools at low tide.

References
 

Acanthoclinus
Endemic marine fish of New Zealand
Fish described in 1985